Souenlovie Creek is a stream in the U.S. state of Mississippi.

Souenlovie is a name derived from the Choctaw language purported to mean "leech killer". Variant names are "Ahsoombeera Creek", "Ashentoun Creek", "Hasunlovieasha Creek", and "Souinlovey Creek".

References

Rivers of Mississippi
Rivers of Clarke County, Mississippi
Rivers of Newton County, Mississippi
Rivers of Jasper County, Mississippi
Mississippi placenames of Native American origin